The Gateway Tower is a conceptual proposal to illustrate a potential use of the abandoned site once planned to house the Chicago Spire in the Streeterville neighborhood of the Near North Side of Chicago.

Details
It was the result of a company-wide internal competition at Gensler to replace the Chicago Spire. , the building is conceptual, and Maxim writer, Scott Tharler, considered the project unlikely. The building would include condos, apartments, a hotel, a Skylobby, a Skydeck with a restaurant, an amusement ride and sky-garden. The base of the building would be in a public park and its supports would span over Lake Shore Drive as well as provide access to the skydeck.

Property background

The Chicago Spire, originally called the Fordham Spire, was originally proposed in July 2005. In March 2006, the initial design of the building was approved by the Chicago Plan Commission, the city's Zoning Committee and the Chicago City Council. In December 2006 and March 2007, the design of the building was revised. The Chicago Plan Commission, Chicago's zoning committee and the Chicago City Council approved the final plans of the Chicago Spire in April and May 2007. By October 2008, the late-2000s recession led to the suspension of construction and a $11.34 million (USD) lien on the construction site. On October 31, 2014 the project's biggest creditor, Related Midwest, compelled the developer, Shelbourne Development Group, to surrender the deed to the property after failing to make the necessary payment.

Notes

Proposed buildings and structures in Illinois
Proposed skyscrapers in the United States
Residential skyscrapers in Chicago
Skyscraper hotels in Chicago

Residential condominiums in Chicago